Philip Richardson (born 1958 in Devonport) is a New Zealand Anglican bishop. Since 2018, he has been the Bishop of Waikato and Taranaki, diocesan bishop of the Diocese of Waikato and Taranaki. Since 2013, he has also been the Senior Bishop of the New Zealand dioceses (Tikanga Pakeha); this makes him one of the three co-equal Archbishops and Primates of the Anglican Church of Aotearoa, New Zealand and Polynesia. 

From 1992 to 1999, Richardson was warden of Selwyn College at the University of Otago. From his consecration on 10 July 1999 until 2008, he was the suffragan Bishop in Taranaki under the diocesan Bishop of Waikato in the then-Diocese of Waikato. In 2008, he became co-diocesan Bishop of Taranaki; but since the 2018 vacancy in the See of Waikato, he has been sole diocesan bishop, called Bishop of Waikato and Taranaki.

References

 

 
 

 
 
 

 
 

Living people
Primates of New Zealand
1958 births
21st-century Anglican archbishops in New Zealand